Wawrzyniec Samp (born 25 June 1939) is a Polish sculptor and graphic artist.

Samp was born in Danzig, Free City of Danzig (present-day Gdańsk, Poland). He graduated from the Academy of Fine Arts in Gdańsk  in 1965, and now he has his own artistic study in the city. He specializes in Pomeranian-Kashubian, marine and sacral graphics.

Projects

His main projects include:
 monuments:
 Tym co za polskośc Gdańska,  Gdańsk
 Czynu partyzanckiego kolejarzy, Czarna Woda
 Józef Wybicki, Kościerzyna
 Pope John Paul II, Gdynia
 Stefan Wyszyński, Gniezno Cathedral
 Swietopelk II, Duke of Pomerania, Gdańsk
 Izydor Gulgowski and Teodora Gulgowska, Wdzydze
 Jerzy Popiełuszko, St. Brigid basilic in Gdańsk
 memorial plates:
 Józef Wrycza, Wiele and Zblewo
 bishop Konstantyn Dominik, Swarzewo
 primate Stefan Wyszyński, 
 Józef Wybicki, patron of a high-school in Gdańsk-Orunia
 Loen Roppel, Luzino
 Florian Ceynowa, Wejherowo hospital
 Polish Kings Coronations, Gniezno cathedral
 Pope John Paul II, Gdynia
 Pope John Paul II, New Port in Gdańsk
 bishop W. Pluta, Gorzów Wielkopolski
 bishop Józef Drzazga, Olsztyn
 Jozef Wilczek, Luzino
 medals and medallions:
 27 medals of Dukes of Pomerania
 650-years of NMP basilic in Gdańsk
 Srebrna Tabakieta Abrahama
 Cech Piekarzy i Cukierników in Gdańsk
 400-years of Gdańsk Library of PAN
 40-years of Kashubian-Pomeranian Association

Publications:
 L. Bądkowski, W. Samp, Poczet książąt Pomorza Gdańskiego, Gdańsk 1974

Awards:
 Medal Stolema, 1974
 Złoty Krzyż Zasługi
 Zasłuzonym Ziemi Gdańskiej
 Złoty Medal Prymasowski Zasłużony w posłudze dla Kościoła i Narodu''
 Nadgoda Miasta Gdańska

References

Polish sculptors
Polish male sculptors
1939 births
Living people
People from the Free City of Danzig
Academy of Fine Arts in Gdańsk alumni